Jiangsu Deep Blue Aerospace Technology Co., Ltd. is a private space launch enterprise founded in November 2016 by Huo Liang. The company is located in the Jiangsu province on the East coast of China. It is engaged in the reusability of rockets.

Nebula 1 
The company is developing the medium-class orbital launch vehicle “Nebula-1.” The rocket will use the 20-ton-thrust kerolox engine named Leiting-20. Deep Blue Aerospace is also developing a larger Nebula-2 launcher, with the ability of sending 4.500 kg to low Earth orbit.

In October 2021, the company completed a 100-meter level launch and landing test with its Nebula M1 VTVL test stage. In January 2022, the company secured nearly $31.5 million in funding. On April 19, the company announce a new round of funding led by CMBC Int’l Holdings, which will be put towards developing the Nebula-1, the "Thunder" engine series, and other manufacturing processes. The amount raised was not disclosed.

On May 6, 2022, the Nebula M1 completed a one kilometer test, that included a vertical takeoff and vertical landing (VTVL) above Tongchuan, Shaanxi Providence. The first orbital launch and recovery of the Nebula-1 is planned for late 2024.

Deep Blue Aerospace is in competition with several other Chinese rocket launcher startups including Galactic Energy, LandSpace, LinkSpace, ExPace, i-Space, OneSpace, Orienspace.

References

External links 
 Official Website

Aerospace companies of China
Space launch vehicles of China
Private spaceflight companies
Commercial spaceflight
Commercial launch service providers
Chinese companies established in 2017